Phurba Tempa Lachenpa (born 4 February 1998) is an Indian professional footballer who plays as a goalkeeper for Indian Super League club Mumbai City.

Club career
Born in Sikkim, Lachenpa was a part of Shillong Lajong's youth side that competed in the Shillong Premier League. In September 2016, after recovering from a serious head injury, Lachenpa was named the club's player of the month. Shillong Lajong head coach, Thangboi Singto, praised Lachenpa saying "After suffering a serious head injury and undergoing an operation, he recovered and came back stronger and has shown a great improvement".

During the 2016–17 I-League season, Lachenpa was the club's second choice goalkeeper, behind Vishal Kaith. The next season, Lachenpa was made the club's first choice goalkeeper and started in Shillong Lajong's first I-League match of the season against Gokulam Kerala. He kept the clean sheet as Shillong Lajong won 1–0.

Mumbai City
On 23 October 2020, Lachenpa signed for Indian Super League club Mumbai City on a four-year deal.

Lachenpa made his debut and his only appearance of the league season, on 8 March, against Goa in the semi-final playoffs coming on in the 120th-minute, seconds before the penalty shootout. He saved the first penalty taken by Edu Bedia, as Mumbai City went on to win 6–5 on penalties and make it to their first-ever Indian Super League final. He won the Indian Super League Winners Shield and the Indian Super League title in his first season.

Lachenpa made his first appearance of the 2021–22 Indian Super League season, on 7 January 2022, against East Bengal, which ended in a 0–0 stalemate.

He was later included in the club's 2022 AFC Champions League squad. He was between the sticks in the club's AFC Champions League debut match, on 8 April 2022, against Al Shabab which ended in a 3–0 defeat. Three days later, he was part of a historic 2–1 win against Al-Quwa Al-Jawiya, as Mumbai City became the first Indian club to win a AFC Champions League game.

Career statistics

Club

Honours
Mumbai City
 ISL Championship: 2020–21
 ISL League Winners Shield: 2020–21, 2022–23

References

1998 births
Living people
Indian footballers
Shillong Lajong FC players
Association football goalkeepers
Footballers from Sikkim
I-League players
Real Kashmir FC players
Indian Super League players
Mumbai City FC players